Morndi or Billy Munro was the last fluent speaker of the Unggumi language of Western Australia.

References

Year of birth missing
Year of death missing
1990s deaths
Indigenous Australians from Western Australia
Last known speakers of an Australian Aboriginal language